Eotrachodon orientalis (meaning "dawn Trachodon from the east") is a species of hadrosaurid that was described in 2016. The holotype was found in the Mooreville Chalk Formation (Upper Santonian) in Alabama in 2007 and includes a well-preserved skull and partial skeleton, making it a rare find among dinosaurs of Appalachia. Another primitive hadrosaur, Lophorhothon, is also known from the same formation, although Eotrachodon lived a few million years prior. A phylogenetic study has found Eotrachodon to be the sister taxon to the hadrosaurid subfamilies Lambeosaurinae and Saurolophinae. This, along with the other Appalachian hadrosaur Hadrosaurus and possibly Lophorhothon, Claosaurus and both species of Hypsibema, suggests that Appalachia was the ancestral area of Hadrosauridae.

See also
 Timeline of hadrosaur research
2016 in paleontology

References

Further reading

 

Late Cretaceous dinosaurs of North America
Hadrosaurs
Fossil taxa described in 2016
Mooreville Chalk
Ornithischian genera